is a former Japanese football player.

Playing career
Kamizono was born in Kanagawa Prefecture on November 28, 1981. He joined J2 League club Mito HollyHock from Bellmare Hiratsuka youth team in 2000. He debuted in 2001 and became a regular player from summer 2001. However he could hardly play in the match in 2003 and retired end of 2003 season. In July 2004, he returned to as player at Japan Football League club ALO's Hokuriku (later Kataller Toyama). He became a regular player and played many matches for a long time. The club was promoted to J2 League. However his opportunity to play decreased from 2009 and he retired end of 2010 season.

Club statistics

References

External links

1981 births
Living people
Association football people from Kanagawa Prefecture
Japanese footballers
J2 League players
Japan Football League players
Mito HollyHock players
Kataller Toyama players
Association football midfielders